State Route 203 is a state highway in the U.S. state of California that serves as a spur route from U.S. Route 395 in Mono County to the town of Mammoth Lakes and Minaret Summit. Within Mammoth Lakes, State Route 203 is known as both "Minaret Road" and "Main Street." It connects to Lake Mary and the Mammoth Scenic Loop via secondary roads.

Route description
The route's western terminus is at Minaret Summit, on the border of Mono County and Madera County approximately 7 miles northeast of Devils Postpile National Monument. It then heads east and intersects with Mammoth Scenic Loop Road, before entering the town of Mammoth Lakes, where it is known as both "Minaret Road" and "Main Street". It continues east to its eastern terminus at U.S. Route 395. 

West of SR 203's western terminus, the road continues locally as "Postpile Road" or "Minaret Summit Rd" for 8.5 miles passing Devils Postpile National Monument and ending at Red's Meadow Resort and Pack Station. East of US-395, the road continues for 1.7 miles as "Old Hwy" connecting utility yards and rural residences to the route.

Minaret Summit receives significant snowfall during the winter. The highway usually closes between Minaret Summit and the Main Lodge of Mammoth Mountain Ski Area before Thanksgiving and usually does not open much before Memorial Day. There is no actual road closure gate here, as the highway is simply not plowed past the area west of the lodge where ski lifts cross over the road.

SR 203 is not part of the National Highway System, a network of highways that are considered essential to the country's economy, defense, and mobility by the Federal Highway Administration.

Major intersections

See also

References

External links

California @ AARoads.com - State Route 203
Caltrans: Route 203 highway conditions
California Highways: SR 203

203
State Route 203
Inyo National Forest